Rod Laver was the defending champion.

Laver successfully defended his title, defeating Tony Roche 6–3, 8–6, 6–2 in the final.

Seeds

  Rod Laver (champion)
  Tony Roche (final)
  John Newcombe (semifinals)
  Tom Okker (third round)
  Ken Rosewall (second round)
  Andrés Gimeno (first round)
  Fred Stolle (third round)
  Arthur Ashe (third round)
  Roy Emerson (third round)
  Earl Butch Buchholz (quarterfinals)
  Stan Smith (third round)
  Dennis Ralston (semifinals)

Draw

Finals

Top half

Section 1

Section 2

Bottom half

Section 3

Section 4

External links
 Main draw

U.S. Pro Indoor
1970 Grand Prix (tennis)